Rackstraw is a surname. Notable people with the surname include: 

Charlie Rackstraw (born 1938), English footballer
Loree Rackstraw (1931–2018), American literary critic
Rob Rackstraw (born 1965), British voice actor
Robert Rackstraw, suspect in the D. B. Cooper skyjacking case

Fictional
The Rackstraw family, characters in the 1922 silent film A Soul's Awakening